Nikola Jovanović (born January 26, 1990) is a Serbian taekwondo athlete.

He won a silver medal at the 2010 European Taekwondo Championships.

References

External links

1990 births
Living people
Serbian male taekwondo practitioners
European Taekwondo Championships medalists
21st-century Serbian people